Wolverhampton Racecourse is a thoroughbred horse racing venue located in Wolverhampton, West Midlands, England. The track was the first to be floodlit in Britain and often holds meetings in the evening.  The track surface has been Tapeta since 2014.

History
There has been a racecourse in Wolverhampton since 1825, in what is now the West Park, where the Park Road follows the line of the track. This was sold to the Corporation in 1878 and, after a gap of nine years, a new course was formed at Dunstall Park. 

In 1993, the final National Hunt meeting took place at Wolverhampton. In December of the same year, the course was re-vamped with floodlights and a new all-weather Fibresand track that ran alongside the turf track. A hotel, new grandstand, restaurant and executive boxes were also built at this time.  The Queen re-opened the racecourse in January 1994. In 1999, the course was bought from private ownership by Arena Leisure. In 2004 the Fibresand and turf tracks were replaced with a single Polytrack surface, as well as refurbishment of the hotel and conference facilities. Since that time the course has only held flat all weather races. 

Following the merger of Arena Leisure and Northern Racing, Wolverhampton became part of Arena Racing Company.

In 2014, the course was closed for redevelopment that included relaying the course with a Tapeta surface. The course reopened on 11 August 2014.

The course has been granted planning permission by Wolverhampton City Council, to expand the hotel from 54 to 170 bedrooms and to tarmac the over-spill car park. The £26 million project also includes plans for a casino which would create the first racino in the UK.

The Lady Wulfruna Stakes is the most valuable race at Wolverhampton.  One of the most notable winners of the race is Sovereign Debt who won the Group 3, 2017 Diomed Stakes at Epsom.  Three-time champion jockey, Ryan Moore, is the most successful in the saddle in the race with four wins.

Course
The course is one mile (1,609 m) in circumference, with tight left-hand turns — giving it greater commonality with most racetracks found in the United States than with other venues in the UK. The straight is short at just two furlongs. The surface was Fibresand until 2004 when it became a Polytrack.  As of 2014, the surface was changed to Tapeta.

Notable races
 Lady Wulfruna Stakes

Concerts
Wolverhampton Racecourse has hosted a number of concerts including Madness, Jess Glynne, Kaiser Chiefs, UB40 and The Human League.

References

External links
Wolverhampton Racecourse (Official website)

 
Horse racing venues in England
Sport in Wolverhampton
Sports venues in the West Midlands (county)
Sports venues completed in 1825